Mandarin Oriental Manila was a hotel along Makati Avenue in Makati, Metro Manila, Philippines, managed by the Mandarin Oriental Hotel Group and designed by National Artist Leandro Locsin.

History
The hotel was designed by Leandro Locsin and a British design consultant. The 18-storey building was built on a site which was known as the Diamond Triangle and opened in 1976. It had the first in-house movie system in the Philippines. Since 1996, the hotel was known for its annual Chinese New Year celebrations. These celebrations were cited among the celebrations within Metro Manila outside Binondo. In 2001, the hotel opened The Spa at Mandarin Oriental, a luxury spa within its premises, becoming the first hotel in the country to have done so.

Closure
On June 4, 2014, The Mandarin Oriental Hotel Group announced that it would close the hotel by the end of 2014. The management began closing the hotel gradually, area by area, instead of shutting down all the hotel areas at once. The hotel saw its last day of operation on September 9, 2014.

Fate of the hotel building

The Heritage Conservation Society (HCS) expressed concern on its Facebook page about the possible demolition of the old Mandarin Oriental Manila building along with InterContinental Manila. Former HCS Vice President and member of the group's Advisory Council, Domic Garcia, who is also an architect, urged for the buildings not to be demolished and argued that while not all of the works of architect Leandro Locsin should be preserved, his best works should. He also suggested that the buildings may be reused for other purposes or integrated into a new design; specifically, he proposed to use the  Mandarin Oriental building as the base of a new and taller tower complementing the architecture of the older building. The HCS also cited the National Cultural Heritage Act of 2009, which stated that works of National Artists such as Locsin were considered as important cultural property.

Under the National Cultural Heritage Act, a site can only be declared a heritage site if it is at least 50 years old. The Mandarin Hotel building was about 38 years old on its full closure in 2014.

Ayala Land stated in September 2014 that the redevelopment of the site of the Mandarin Oriental Manila was being planned along with architectural consultations with LVLP, the firm of Leandro Locsin. The redevelopment of the site of InterContinental Manila was also being planned.

New Mandarin Oriental Manila
The lease of the management of the Mandarin Oriental Manila with Ayala Land was due to end in 2026 but the board decided to close the hotel instead of waiting for the lease to expire. The new Mandarin Oriental Manila will be built across the street at the Ayala Triangle Gardens and is planned to have 275 rooms. The new hotel to be developed and owned by Ayala Land Hotels & Resorts is planned to be completed by 2020.

References

External links
 Mandarin Oriental Manila website—(archived)

Hotels in Metro Manila
Demolished hotels
Mandarin Oriental Hotel Group
Buildings and structures in Makati
Hotels established in 1976
Hotels disestablished in 2014
Hotel buildings completed in 1976
Buildings and structures demolished in 2016
1976 establishments in the Philippines
2014 disestablishments in the Philippines
Leandro Locsin buildings
Modernist architecture in the Philippines